Costello Music is the debut album by Scottish indie rock band the Fratellis. It was released on 11 September 2006 on Fallout Records and Drop the Gun Recordings and on 13 March 2007 on Cherrytree Records in the US and was a success, peaking at number 2 on the UK Albums Chart and spent 83 weeks in the Top 100. It debuted behind FutureSex/LoveSounds by Justin Timberlake and stayed in the No. 2 position for two more weeks, this time behind Ta-Dah by Scissor Sisters. The album had five single releases, as well as the download-only EP Flathead. "Chelsea Dagger" was the most successful single, peaking at No. 5 in the UK and No. 4 in the Netherlands, but the other singles failed to chart in most countries.

The band toured the record internationally, playing shows in Europe, the United States and Japan, and won the 2007 BRIT Award for Best British Breakthrough Act. As of March 2018, the album had sold 1,145,000 copies in the UK.

Background
The band's first gig was in a basement in Glasgow in February 2005. The band were spotted by a record company talent scout shortly thereafter. ''Music Weeks Stuart Clarke said, "A month after the scout discovered them, labels were flying up to Scotland to see them. Most, if not all, the major labels and a handful of indies showed a lot of interest in the band." The band was eventually signed to Island Records and the album was released under its UK subsidiary, Fallout Records. The band were flown to LA to record the album in the Sunset Sound recording studio, which was previously used by Bob Dylan and the Beach Boys. They were in Studio 3, which contains vintage equipment. Jon said, "It makes you feel a bit more like you’re part of something you were interested in". Producer Tony Hoffer was flown in to help complete the album. The album was named "Costello Music" after a studio they used to rent in Budhill, Glasgow.

Lyrics and composition
Critics likened the album to the works of The Libertines, Babyshambles and Arctic Monkeys, all bands known for their British rock roots. Sal Cinquemani of Slant Magazine said that "they sound like songs by about 15 other Britpop acts" but went on to say "it's one thing to copy a look, a sound, or a formula, it's another to do it so utterly convincingly and with such infectious raucousness".

Paul McNamee of NME noted that most tracks on the album told a story; "Henrietta", tells the story of an older woman who stalks the song's narrators; "Vince the Lovable Stoner" is about a man with a drug addiction, and "Chelsea Dagger" is said by Jon Fratelli to be about a showgirl.

Release
Costello Music was released on vinyl and CD on 11 September 2006 in the UK. Five songs were released as singles; "Henrietta", "Chelsea Dagger", "Whistle for the Choir", "Baby Fratelli" and "Ole Black 'n' Blue Eyes". "Flathead" was used in an iPod commercial, which led to it being released as a download only single via iTunes and later as an EP. The album was then released on 13 March 2007 in the US. The cover art for the album and its singles was created by Sam Hadley.

The album did best in the UK, peaking at number two on the charts there. It reached forty-two on the US Billboard 200, and managed to chart in Switzerland, Austria, the Netherlands, France and New Zealand. "Chelsea Dagger" was the most successful single, peaking at five in the UK and four in the Netherlands. The other singles with the exception of "Flathead" only managed to chart in the UK, where they were moderately popular.

A Japanese version of Costello Music was released on 21 February 2007 containing two tracks unavailable on other versions: "Dirty Barry Stole the Bluebird" – a B-side of the "Chelsea Dagger" single, and "Cigarello" from the Flathead EP. This version of the album also contained the videos for "Flathead", "Chelsea Dagger", and "Henrietta", which could be viewed directly from the disc using an Adobe Flash program.

The album's success led to the band winning the BRIT award for Best British Breakthrough Act in 2007. The album also won an EBBA award in January 2008. In total, the band sold 1.5 million copies of Costello Music worldwide and over 900,000 copies in the UK.

Reception

Costello Music received generally favourable reviews. Pitchforks Stuart Bertman called the Fratellis "artless but amiable", "predictable", and "intermittently rewarding". Elizabeth Goodman of Rolling Stone called the single Flathead "preternaturally catchy" and stated that "it makes you elated in the moment". Helen Phares of AllMusic called it "high energy" and "fun in the moment". Stylus Magazine'''s Ryan Foley shared similar views, describing it as "beyond infectious" and claiming that they fill "their three-minute, pop-punk ditties with melodic snarl, flouncing sass, and enough lusty sing-along parts to keep the punters busy". IGN's Chad Grischow gave the album an Outstanding rating in his review of the album saying it was "not the most refined album you will buy this year, but surely one you will not regret". Sal Cinquemani of Slant Magazine was less favourable, calling it "tediously misogynistic" and "instantly memorable but thankfully wordless".Costello Music was voted the fourth-worst Scottish album ever in a 2007 online poll of music fans.

Tour
Following the release of the album, the Fratellis embarked on a tour of the UK festival circuit, headlining at popular festivals such as NMEs Rock ‘n’ Riot tour and T in the Park 2007, amongst others. They opened for The Who at the BBC Electric Proms in October 2006, and in December they supported Kasabian on their UK tour before playing 10 dates by themselves in February and March 2007. The locations included Nottingham, Manchester, Glasgow, Birmingham and London.

They then set out on a worldwide tour to play dates in Japan, continental Europe and the US. They cut short the US leg of their tour, canceling nine dates, citing fatigue from their many months of touring as the cause.

Track listing

Bonus tracks
 "The Gutterati?" – 2:28 (Replaces "Cuntry Boys & City Girls" on US version as Track No. 5, moving "Whistle for the Choir" to Track No. 3 and "Chelsea Dagger" to Track #4)
 "Ole Black 'n' Blue Eyes" is a hidden track on the US version.
 "Dirty Barry Stole the Bluebird" – 4:04 (Bonus track on Japanese version)
 "Cigarello" – 3:06 (Bonus track on Japanese version)
 Some versions of the CD have the track "Cuntry Boys & City Girls" moved to a hidden track, Track No. 13.

Personnel
 Jon Fratelli – lead vocals, guitar
 Barry Fratelli – bass guitar, shouting
 Mince Fratelli – drums, backup vocals, banjo 
 Tony Hoffer – production, mixing
 Todd Burke and Tony Hoffer – engineering
 Shane Watson – horn

Charts

Weekly charts

Year-end charts

Certifications

References

Chart archives

External links
 Official Fratellis Website
 Costello Music at Google Music
 
 

2006 debut albums
The Fratellis albums
Albums produced by Tony Hoffer
European Border Breakers Award-winning albums